Mahavarat Vidyalankar (or Mahavrat) (-1963) was an Indian left-wing nationalist and translator. He was a close advisor and comrade of Subhas Chandra Bose and a founding member of the All India Forward Bloc, a leftist party which held the most uncompromising position on India's Independence. He was imprisoned by the colonial authorities  in the famous Red Fort prison.

Early life
As a young man Vidyalankar was sent by his father to study Engineering at the University of Edinburgh in Scotland. There he came in contact with many leftist scholars and was highly influenced by Marxist philosophy. After obtaining his degree he secretly left England to further study Marxist-Leninism in Russia. He spent almost 17 years in Russia and became a scholar of the Russian language translating Russian literature into Hindi. During that time he travelled extensively to Mongolia and translated literature from Mongolian to Hindi as well. While in Mongolia he came in contact with Borjigin Dashdorjiin Natsagdorj a Mongolian poet and writer. They became close friends and later he translated many of Natsagdorj's works into Hindi. He returned to India with a unique understanding of imperialism and believed that only socialism could give India meaningful and true Independence.

Later life
After working many years with Congress members he met Subhas Chandra Bose and sharing a common vision for India's future and a common understanding of India's needs the two formed a close friendship. He convinced Bose to travel to Russia for assistance in India's struggle. Mahavarat Vidyalankar was also a writer of many books on both politics and Sanskrit.  As a scholar of Sanskrit, Russian, and Mongolian and he has also translated many books from these languages into Hindi and English. He died in 1965.  He had 3 children all of whom eventually left India.

Homeland
Mahavarat Vidyalankar lived in Pahari Dhiraj in Old Delhi. His house, known as "Dayal Vas" named after his father Har Dayal Singh Saini was known to be the hub and hiding placed of many prominent Indian Freedom Fighters such as Sheel Bhadra Yajee, Maulana Abul Kalam Azad, Sarojini Naidu, Mahavir Tyagi, and many I.N.A heroes such as Dhillon and Sehgal. In fact, when he was imprisoned by the British it was Sarojini Naidu who arranged for his daughter, Indira, to be sent to live in Hyderabad with her son Jayasuria and her daughter-in-law, as her mother had died many years earlier from tuberculosis.  The historic house is still standing in Old Delhi, in Mandir Wali Gali.

Children
His three children all emigrated to America in the 1950s and lived in Northern Pennsylvania. Indira Kumari, his only daughter became a professor of Botany and Biology in Scranton. She married Gokran Nath Srivastrava who was a prominent professor of Physics at the University of Scranton and one of the first Physicists to work with the electron microscope.

References 
Madhya Pradesh Through the Ages, pp 417, By S.R. Bakshi And O.P. Ralhan, Sarup & Sons, 2007
Terrorism is Comes from Us by Barathkumar PKT By A.Palanivelu
Communism in India, 1924–1927, pp 106, Sir David Petrie, Mahadeva Prasad Saha, Sir Cecil Kaye - 1927

Year of birth missing
Indian independence activists from Delhi
All India Forward Bloc politicians
Subhas Chandra Bose
1965 deaths
Scholars from Delhi
20th-century Indian politicians